Kassaro  is a village and rural commune in the Cercle of Kita in the Kayes Region of south-western Mali. The commune includes 18 villages and in the 2009 census had a population of 18,442.

References

External links
.

Communes of Kayes Region